Madhya Pradesh State Highway 4 (MP SH 4)  is a state highway running from Lakwasa till Chanderi via Isagarh and Piprod.

The highway connects towns in Northern Madhya Pradesh. Chanderi is an important town for textile industries.

See also
List of state highways in Madhya Pradesh

References

State Highways in Madhya Pradesh